Shahriar Alam (born 1 March 1970) is a Bangladeshi politician. He has been  serving as the state minister of foreign relations for government of the People's Republic of Bangladesh since January 2014.

Early life
Shahriar Alam was born to the family of Mohammad Shamsuddin and Hafiza Khatun at Chattogram District. He spent his early life in Lalmonirhat and Rajshahi.

Education
In 1985, he passed SSC from Seroil Government High School, Rajshahi and HSC from Rajshahi New Government Degree College in 1988. He received his Bachelor of Commerce degree from Dhaka City College and obtained an MBA from Institute of Business Administration (IBA), University of Dhaka afterwards. Shahriar completed 1st Capstone course at the Bangladesh National Defence College (NDC).

Career
Alam started his career as a businessman in Ready Made Garments (RMG) Sector in 1995. As a prominent entrepreneur having an interest in different fields, his main focus was on textile industry that employed 25 thousand workers. As one of leading exporters, his company exporting to major destinations which include, among others, Japan, Australia, and Russia. He won the National Export Trophy in Knitwear Category for 2007–2008. The business house established by him trains disables with the assistance from the Center for the Rehabilitation of the Paralyzed (CRP) and employs the highest number of physically challenged individuals. This led to CSR Award from global buyers.

Politics 
Alam was elected a member of Rajshahi-6 (Bagha-Charghat) constituency no 56 of the Jatiya Sangsad located in Rajshahi District in the 2014 general elections. He has been working as an active member of Bangladesh Awami League since 1997. He was elected a member of the Jatiya Sangsad for the first time from the Rajshahi-6 constituency in the maximum parliamentary elections in the 2008 parliamentary elections. While working as a member of the Parliamentary Standing Committee on the Ministry of Information of the Jatiya Sangsad, he worked for the finalization of the draft of the Right to Information Act. Besides, he is a member of Standing Committee on Ministry of Science and Technology related to the Jatiya Sangsad, All Party Parliamentary Group on Climate Change, Education and Poverty Alleviation and MDG, PRSP, World Trade Organization and Vice Chairman of All Party Parliamentary Group regarding Bangladesh Development Forum. Shahriar Alam has served as a member of the Parliament Committee on the preview committee. He was earlier a member of the Sub-Committee on Awami League's information, research and publicity and publication.

References

External links
 

1970 births
Living people
People from Chittagong
University of Dhaka alumni
Awami League politicians
State Ministers of Foreign Affairs (Bangladesh)
9th Jatiya Sangsad members
10th Jatiya Sangsad members
11th Jatiya Sangsad members
National Defence College (Bangladesh) alumni